Independent Social Democratic Party was a Czech political party, formed by Czech trade unionists belonging to the Imperial Trade Union Commission in 1910. The party was supported by the Austrian Social Democracy.

References

Political parties in Austria-Hungary
Political parties established in 1910
Social democratic parties